James Stewart (18 June 1827 – 28 May 1895) was a Scottish Liberal Party politician, elected as a member of parliament for Greenock in 1878, resigning in 1884 to become Steward of the Manor of Northstead.

References

External links 
 

1827 births
1895 deaths
Deputy Lieutenants of Ayrshire
Scottish Liberal Party MPs
Politics of Inverclyde
UK MPs 1874–1880
UK MPs 1880–1885
19th-century Scottish people